"" is the national anthem of Bulgaria. It was composed and written by Tsvetan Radoslavov as he left to fight in the Serbo-Bulgarian War in 1885. The anthem was adopted in 1964. The text has been changed many times, most recently in 1990. On 12 July 1991 the anthem was shortened to its first verse along with the chorus.

Between 1886 and 1947, the Bulgarian national anthem was "Shumi Maritsa"; from 1951 to 1964, it was "Balgariyo mila, zemya na geroi"; in the brief period between these two, it was the march "Republiko nasha, zdravey!".

History

Creation 
The song was created by the composer Tsvetan Radoslavov in 1885 after his participation in the Serbo-Bulgarian War. He was inspired to create the song based on his poems when he saw Serbian students singing their own patriotic song on their journey home. It was first printed in 1895 in Part I of "Music Textbook" by K. Mahan.

Adoption as the national anthem 
In the 1960s after the de-Stalinization process, the poet Georgi Dzhagarov began an effort to replace the previous anthem, which include references to Stalin and because the lyrics of the anthem were similar to the anthem of the Soviet Union. After discussing with Todor Zhivkov, the General Secretary of the Bulgarian Communist Party, Zhivkov accepted the idea, and soon, by the Order No.1093, on 29 March 1962, the Council of Ministers held a competition for the lyrics and the music for the new anthem, with the deadline for the submission of lyrics on 1 May 1963 and the music on 1 November 1963. The committee for the new anthem was selected by Zhivkov himself. The lyrics for the new anthem were finalized on 1 September 1963, and the music was finalized on 1 March 1964. The Council of Ministers also drew up a panel of experts to look at the projects submitted in advance and to put the best of the proposals to discussion amongst the committee.

After the proposals for the lyrics and the music were submitted, the committee was not satisfied, so they accepted the advice of Georgi Dzhagarov to use "Mila Rodino" as the music for the new anthem. The duty of composing lyrics was assigned to Georgi Dzhagarov and Dmitry Metodiev, while the melody of the anthem was revised with further harmonization by Philip Kutev and Alexander Raichev.

Under Zhivkov's orders, Georgi Dzhagarov and Dimitar Metodiev were resided in the Vrana Palace to compose the text of Mila Rodino.

During the composition of the lyrics, Georgi Dzhagarov was not particularly proud of his creation. He preferred the anthem without the mentions of the Soviet Union and the leadership of the Bulgarian Communist Party in the third verse of the anthem. An alternate version of the third verse can be found in Dzhagarov's manuscript :
 (Together, Bulgarian brothers!)
 (New pinnacles shine,)
 (The flag flies above us)
 (and calls us to heroic deeds.)

The final composition of the lyrics consisted of the original first verse and the chorus of the anthem by Tsvetan Radoslavov, and the new two verses, which the second verse has references to the fight for the independence of Bulgaria and the fight against fascism in World War 2, and the third verse has references to the Soviet Union/Russian SFSR/Communist Party of the Soviet Union, and the Communist Party of Bulgaria.

On 8 September 1964 "Mila Rodino" was finally affirmed by the Presidium of the National Assembly, with the Decree No. 534, as the national anthem of Bulgaria. The first performance of the song as the national anthem of Bulgaria took place on 9 September 1964, the 20th anniversary of the Socialist Revolution of 9 September.

Criticism 
In 1964, before the affirmation of "Mila Rodino" as the national anthem, the decision met resistance from Petko Staynov. Staynov argued that the melody is of Ashkenazi Jewish origin and this makes the song not suitable for being the anthem of Bulgaria. Dobri Hristov counters the argument, stating that there are hundreds of melodies in Bulgarian songs which are borrowed from other people and thus became an integral part of the Bulgarian musical heritage.

This statement led Staynov being removed from the committee for the new anthem by Todor Zhivkov.

Proposals for a new anthem 
During the discussion for the new constitution of Bulgaria in the 7th Grand National Assembly, there are some proposals submitted for a new anthem. The proposals include "Shumi Maritsa"—the Bulgarian national anthem from 1886 to 1947, and "Varvi, narode vazrodeni"—the anthem of the Bulgarian education.

The most recent one was the petition by writer Nikola Indzhov to change the anthem of Bulgaria to "Vărvi, narode văzrodeni".

Regulation on the anthem

Current regulation 
According to the Institutional Identity of the Administration of the State of Bulgaria, there are two versions of the anthem, the full and the abridged version.

Official version of the anthem 
 The official version of the anthem in an instrumental rendition for wind orchestra is performed by the Brass Orchestra of the National Guard.
 The official version of the anthem in an instrumental rendition for symphony orchestra is performed by the Bulgarian National Radio Symphony Orchestra.
 The official version of the anthem in a vocal version is performed by the Mixed Choir of the Bulgarian National Radio.

Performances of the anthem 
The anthem is to be played at the following occasions:
 celebration of the Liberation Day on 3 March
 on public holidays, celebrating historical events and personalities
 ceremonies for raising the flag of the Republic of Bulgaria
 state and official visits
 ceremonies for offering a wreath to the monument of the Unknown Soldier
 diplomatic ceremonies
 military ceremonies
 other official events of national importance
 on the initiative of the state authorities
 local celebrations with a decision of the Municipal Council

The abridged version of the anthem can be played at the following occasions:
 on cultural and sporting events
 on the occasion of the opening of the school year

The anthem of the Republic of Bulgaria can only be performed once a day, on the same ceremony.

Bans on the usage of the anthem 
The anthem of the Republic of Bulgaria can not be used in advertising, with the exception of national campaigns taken by state authorities. The anthem can not be used as part of another melody or song, to be performed in remixed variants with text other than the legally established by means of musical instruments that create a humorous sound, with pauses, interruptions or extensions of the tones, which change the original sound.

Original regulation 
The first regulation on the anthem came from the Decree No. 534 "On the approval of the text and the music of the national anthem of the People's Republic of Bulgaria", which was published on 8 September 1964.

Lyrics

Modern lyrics
The anthem currently officially consists of the first verse and chorus. During communist rule, two additional verses (II and III) were added that referred to Moscow (under direct instructions of Todor Zhivkov) and the Bulgarian Communist Party, as well as the fallen fighters for Bulgaria through the years. After the changes in 1989, this part of the anthem was removed and forbidden to be performed.

Original lyrics

Other versions 
Another version of the lyrics was published by composer Dobri Hristov. It was published in the Rodina collection, by the Publishing of the Bulgarian-Mohammedian Cultural and Enlightenment Friendship, in the town of Smolyan.

In popular culture 
In October 2017, a Redditor reported an incident where Siri thought the national anthem of Bulgaria was Luis Fonsi's single "Despacito". This bug was fixed afterwards.

Sheet Music

See also
 Coat of arms of Bulgaria
 Flag of Bulgaria
 National Guards Unit of Bulgaria

Notes

References

External links

 President of the Republic of Bulgaria (archive link) — The President's website has a page on the national symbols of Bulgaria, including a vocal version of the anthem.
 Government of Bulgaria — The Government website also has a National Symbols page, with an instrumental version of the anthem.
 Bulgaria: Mila Rodino - Audio of the national anthem of Bulgaria, with information and lyrics (archive link)

Bulgarian patriotic songs
European anthems
National symbols of Bulgaria
National anthem compositions in A minor
National anthem compositions in C major